T. M. "Doc" Kellough (died c. 1956-57) was an early ice hockey player and was the first captain of the Grosvenor House Canadians and played in the English National League. He was inducted to the British Ice Hockey Hall of Fame in 1950.

References
British Ice Hockey Hall of Fame entry

British Ice Hockey Hall of Fame inductees
Canadian ice hockey players
Year of birth missing
Year of death missing
Place of birth missing
Place of death missing